Black' Smith is an Italian restaurant franchise in South Korea. It is operated by the Caffe Bene chain, which also operates in South Korea.

References

External links
 

Restaurant chains in South Korea
Italian restaurants